Luigi Trussardi (6 June 1938 – 29 April 2010) was a French jazz bassist.

He was born Louis Félix Angelo Trussardi in Clichy on 6 June 1938.

References 

1931 births
1979 deaths
20th-century French people
20th-century French musicians
French jazz musicians